This is a partial discography of Madama Butterfly (Madame Butterfly), an opera by Giacomo Puccini. The original version of the opera premiered on February 17, 1904, at La Scala in Milan.

Audio recordings

Video recordings

References
Notes

Sources
Blyth, Alan, ed. Opera on Record. Hutchinson & Co., London. 1979.
Gruber, Paul, ed. The Metropolitan Opera Guide to Recorded Opera. W.W. Norton & Co., New York. 1993.

Opera discographies
Operas by Giacomo Puccini